The 2001 WAFL season was the 117th season of the various incarnations of the West Australian Football League. Following the off-season “Fong Report” by WAFC President Neale Fong which was written as a response to the problems then faced on-and off-field by AFL and domestic football in Western Australia, the league reverted to calling itself the ‘WAFL’ because it was acknowledged ‘Westar Rules’ was painfully contrived and did not reflect the history or traditions of the local game.

2001 also saw the abandonment of the “double-header” system of playing finals that began with the replay of the 1989 First semi-final, and also an unsuccessful experiment of giving each club four byes during the home-and-away season rather than three.

East Perth continued on from their dominance of the 2000 season to win a second successive premiership for the first time in forty-two seasons, thrashing a South Fremantle team that came from third position – after along with minor premiers Claremont completely dominating the season up to the end of May – to the Grand Final. Former West Coast Eagle regular Ryan Turnbull became the second player in four seasons to complete the Sandover/Simpson double. 2000 Grand Finalists East Fremantle, after having the best WAFL/Westar record during the 1990s, fell to second-last ahead of only financially crippled Swan Districts and were to play only one final during the rest of the decade. Peel Thunder, after advancing to four wins in 2000, advanced further despite the “Fong Report” recommending the withdrawal of their licence and at one time looked a chance for the finals, but the off-field pressure caused them to falter severely in the run home.

Home-and-away season

Round 1

Round 2

Round 3 (Easter weekend)

Round 4

Round 5

Round 6

Round 7

Round 8

Round 9

Round 10 (Foundation Day)

Round 11

Round 12

Round 13

Round 14

Round 15

Round 16

Round 17

Round 18

Round 19

Round 20

Round 21

Round 22

Ladder

Finals

First semi-final

Second semi-final

Preliminary final

Grand Final

Notes
In reference to East Perth serving as the host club for West Coast and thus having numerous Eagles players in their team.Kickett had earned a nine-week suspension in the second 2000 Western Derby.The others were Phil Matson with East Perth from 1919 to 1923, Clive Lewington with South Fremantle from 1950 to 1954, Jack Sheedy with East Perth from 1956 to 1961, and Gerard Neesham with Claremont from 1987 to 1991

References

External links
Official WAFL website
West Australian Football League (WAFL), 2001

West Australian Football League seasons
WAFL